De Facto is the first EP by American dub reggae band De Facto. It was recorded in June 1999 at Jeremy Ward's home studio Pagan Roma and released on Headquarter Records (spelled as "Head 1/4" on paper insert) as a limited vinyl pressing, and is currently very hard to find.

The EP was later repackaged and released as How Do You Dub? You Fight For Dub. You Plug Dub In.

Track listing 
Side A
"Coaxial" – 1:42
"Madagascar" – 3:03
"Agua Minerál" – 2:07
"De Facto" – 1:58
"1024½" – 0:29
Side B
"Thick Vinyl Plate" – 3:04
"Drop" – 4:20
"Radio Rebelde" – 2:32

Personnel 
Omar Rodríguez-López – bass
Cedric Bixler-Zavala – drums, keyboards, samples
Jeremy Ward – melodica, voice, sound manipulation
Ralph Jasso – keyboards

External links 

De Facto (band) albums
1999 debut EPs